Eagle Atlantic Airlines was a short-lived Ghanaian airline based in Accra. It commenced operations in October 2013 and ceased in 2014.

History
Eagle Atlantic Airlines received its Air Operation Certificate (AOC) in August 2013 and was the first wholly owned Ghanaian flag carrier after Ghana Airways and Ghana International Airlines ceased operations.

It ceased all operations in 2014.

Destinations
The airline flies to five international destinations.

Fleet

As of December 2015, the Eagle Atlantic Airlines fleet consists of the following aircraft:

References

Defunct airlines of Ghana
Airlines established in 2013
Airlines disestablished in 2014
Ghanaian companies established in 2013